Kurt Dalgaard Berthelsen (born 27 November 1943) is a Danish former footballer who played as a forward for Hvidovre IF and AaB. He played in one match for the Denmark national team in 1972 and competed in the men's tournament at the 1972 Summer Olympics.

References

External links
 

1943 births
Living people
Danish men's footballers
Association football forwards
Denmark international footballers
Olympic footballers of Denmark
Footballers at the 1972 Summer Olympics
Hvidovre IF players
AaB Fodbold players